Miss America 1925, the fifth Miss America pageant, was held at the Million Dollar Pier in Atlantic City, New Jersey on Friday, September 11, 1925. Entrants from the West Coast, Miss California, Fay Lanphier from Oakland, and Miss Los Angeles, Adrienne Dore, captured the top two awards. The newly crowned beauty queen was a runner-up in the 1924 competition. Lanphier was also the first Miss America crowned representing an entire state.

Reports were received that King Neptune, portrayed by actor Ernest Torrence, somehow fell into the ocean and had to be pulled out ("rescued") by lifeguards. Also on hand for the final night of pageant activities was Triton, son of Neptune, played by Douglas Fairbanks, Jr.

Ruth Malcomson the winner from the previous year decided not to defend her title due to her belief that professionals were entering the Inter-City competition as a Hollywood film was to be shot around the 1925 pageant. Her decision drew controversy in the press, and began false speculation that the pageant wasn't on the up and up. The pageant committee quickly instituted a new rule that no Miss America could return to competition.

Results

Placements

Other awards

Contestants

References

External links

 Miss America official website

1925
1925 in the United States
1925 in New Jersey
September 1925 events
Events in Atlantic City, New Jersey